The Episcopal Diocese of Mississippi, created in 1826, is the diocese of the Episcopal Church in the United States of America with jurisdiction over the entire state of Mississippi. It is located in Province 4 and its cathedral, St. Andrew's Cathedral, is located in Jackson, as are the diocesan offices.
 
Episcopalians in Mississippi have, since the mid-20th century, been by and large progressive in their views about race, culture, and other social issues affecting the state and nation; their views on economics and politics, though, are more mixed, as is usually the case elsewhere. The Episcopal Church in Mississippi has usually tolerated freedom of belief and differing types of ritual practice (e.g., Anglo-Catholicism in Biloxi and a liberal orientation in communities like Oxford and Starkville where colleges have significant presences). As such, the fallout from the ideological and theological conflicts that beset the Episcopal Church between the 1970s and 2000s (such as the Gene Robinson controversy) has not been large in comparison to other Southern dioceses (e.g., Tennessee, Fort Worth, South Carolina).

As of 2013 the Diocese of Mississippi had 18,741 members, down from 20,925 in 2003, a decline of approximately 10 percent.

Current bishop
Brian R. Seage was elected on May 3, 2014, at St. Andrew’s Cathedral in Jackson, and received the required consents from a majority of bishops and standing committees of the Episcopal Church. He succeeded Duncan M. Gray III as the bishop of Mississippi, becoming the 10th, when Gray retired in February 2015.

List of bishops
The bishops of Mississippi have been:
 William Mercer Green (1850–1887)Hugh Miller Thompson, bishop coadjutor 1883
 Hugh Miller Thompson (1887–1902)
 Theodore D. Bratton (1903–1938)William Mercer Green (grandson) bishop coadjutor 1919
 William Mercer Green (grandson) (1938–1942)
 Duncan Montgomery Gray, Sr. (1943–1966)John M. Allin, bishop coadjutor 1961
 John M. Allin (1966–1974)Duncan Montgomery Gray, Jr., bishop coadjutor 1974
 Duncan Montgomery Gray, Jr. (1974–1993)Alfred C. Marble Jr., bishop coadjutor 1991
 Alfred C. Marble Jr. (1993–2003)
 Duncan Montgomery Gray III (2003–2015)
 Brian R. Seage (2015–present)

See also

 List of Succession of Bishops for the Episcopal Church, USA
 Chapel of the Cross
 St. Alban's Episcopal Church (Bovina, Mississippi)

References

External links
Episcopal Diocese of Mississippi website
 St. Andrew's Episcopal Cathedral website
Official Web site of the Episcopal Church
Journal of the Annual Convention, Diocese of Mississippi

1826 establishments in Mississippi
Anglican dioceses established in the 19th century
Christianity in Mississippi
Mississippi
Province 4 of the Episcopal Church (United States)
Religious organizations established in 1826